Anarchism has been an undercurrent in the politics of Palestine and Israel for over a century. The anarchist ideology arrived in Palestine at the beginning of the 20th century, carried by a big wave of emigrants from Eastern Europe (Russia, Lithuania, Ukraine, Poland). The ideas of Peter Kropotkin and Leo Tolstoy had remarkable influence on famous exponents of some Left Zionists. Anarchists organized themselves across Israel and Palestine, and influenced the worker movement in Israel. Anarchists often call for a zero state solution, to the Palestinian Israeli conflict, in reference to a complete abolition of the states of Israel and Palestine.

Early Kibbutz movement 

The anarchist ideology arrived in Palestine at the beginning of the 20th century, carried by a big wave of emigrants from Eastern Europe (Russia, Lithuania, Ukraine, Poland). The ideas of Peter Kropotkin and Leo Tolstoy had remarkable influence on famous exponents of some Left Zionists, such as Yitzhak Tabenkin, Berl Katznelson, and Mark Yarblum.  The organizer of the Jewish self-defense movement, Joseph Trumpeldor, who later became a hero of the Israeli right, was very close to anarcho-syndicalism and even declared himself an anarcho-communist. Anarchism has also had some influence on the constitution of socio-political movements such as Poalei Zion, Tzeirei Zion, HeHalutz, and Gdud HaAvoda.

The early kibbutz movement was libertarian socialist in nature. At that time, many leftist Zionists rejected the idea of establishing a Jewish nation-state and promoted Jewish-Arab cooperation.

The anarchists in Palestine at the beginning of the century, nearly all coming from Eastern Europe, did not have connections with the powerful Yiddish anarchist movement and had adopted the Hebrew language, which was unpopular among the European Jewish anarchists, many of whom opposed all forms of Zionism and supported the grassroots Yiddish culture of the Ashkenazi Jewry. In the 1920s and 1930s all lived on the kibbutz: for example, the famous anarchist Aharon Shidlovsky was one of the founders of the kibbutz Kvutzat Kinneret.

During the Spanish Revolution many anarchists of Palestine rushed to Spain in order to fight against Franco and fascism in the ranks of the libertarian CNT-FAI militia.

The Austrian-Jewish anti-authoritarian philosopher Martin Buber settled in Jerusalem in 1938. Buber considered himself a "cultural Zionist". He rejected the idea of Jewish nationalism and was a staunch supporter of a bi-national solution in Palestine. While many Jewish anarchists were irreligious or sometimes vehemently anti-religious, there were also a few religious anarchists and pro-anarchist thinkers, who combined contemporary radical ideas with the traditional anarchistic trends in Kabbalah and Hasidism (see Anarchism and Orthodox Judaism). The Orthodox Kabbalist rabbi Yehuda Ashlag, who moved to Palestine in 1921, believed in voluntary communism, based on the principles of Kabbalah.

Ashlag supported the Kibbutz movement and preached to establish a network of self-ruled internationalist communes, who would eventually annul the brute-force regime completely, for “every man did that which was right in his own eyes.”, because there is nothing more humiliating and degrading for a person than being under the brute-force government. However, most of the contemporary followers of Ashlagian Kabbalah seem to ignore the radical teachings of their rebbe.

Anarchism in the State of Israel

A little before and immediately after the constitution of the State of Israel, in 1948, there was an influx of western European anarchist survivors of Nazism, educated in Yiddish, and among them, anarchism had a specific and visible presence.

Between the end of the 1940s and the beginning of the 1950s, Polish immigrants formed an anarchist group in Tel Aviv whose main exponent was Eliezer Hirschauge, author of a book on the history of the Polish anarchist movement published in 1953. Beginning in the 1950s, Israeli anarchism makes reference to Abba Gordin (1887–1964), writer and philosopher, one of the more remarkable representatives of the Yiddish anarchist movement.

Gordin had been the inspirer of the pan-Russian anarchist movement and one of the organizers of the Anarchist Federation of Moscow (1918). From 1925, he lived in New York city, where he had emigrated and where he published a literary philosophical review, Yiddishe Shriften (1936–1957), as well as being a habitual contributor to the most long-lived anarchist periodical in the Yiddish language, the Freie Arbeiter Stimme (1890–1977).

In 1958, Abba Gordin moved to Israel, and in Tel Aviv, founded a Yiddish anarchist circle, "Agudath Schochrei Chofesh" (ASHUACH), with a library of classic anarchist works in Yiddish, Hebrew, and Polish, and with a large hall for meetings and conferences. He also began to publish a bilingual monthly review (in Yiddish and Hebrew), Problemen/Problemot, which he directed from 1959 to 1964. During this period, ASHUACH had approximately 150 members and drew hundred of people to conferences on the philosophy of anarchism. Among the more debated topics: the spiritual roots of anarchism and the connections between anarchism, the Book of the Prophets (Neviim), and the Kabbalah. Problemen published stories and articles on the history of anarchism, Hasidic legends, medieval Jewish literature and the current problems of Yiddish literature.

After the death of Abba Gordin, from 1964 to 1971 the review was directed by Shmuel Abarbanel. In 1971, Joseph Luden (born in Warsaw, 1908) took his place and affiliated the review with a publishing house that published fifteen or so books and pamphlets of fiction and poetry, all in Yiddish. Therefore, since Problemen came to be solely in Yiddish, it lost the Hebrew half of its title. The number of pages went from 24 to 36. ASHUACH came to a halt in the 1980s. The old anarchists died one after the other and none of the young ones knew Yiddish. The last issue of Problemen was published in December 1989 (it was the one-hundred-and-sixty-fifth issue). Subsequently, Joseph Luden tried to share with one new review, Freie Stimme, in order to continue the tradition of Problemen, but only printed a single issue in September, 1991. This was the last Yiddish anarchist periodical publication in the world.

Contemporary anarchist movement

Anarchists Against the Wall supports Palestinians against segregation in the West Bank and takes direct actions against the Israeli government with demonstrations, human blockades, and destruction of the border fence.

One Struggle (Ma'avak Ehad) is a social anarchist affinity group in Israel.

References

Bibliography

External links 
   An article on Israeli anarchism today by Uri Gordon
 It's All Lies - Israel anarchist and radical scene
 
 Anarchism Eight Questions on Kibbituzim - Answers from Noam Chomsky, Questions from Nikos Raptis, from Znet Commetnaries, August 24, 1999
 Yiddish Anarchist Bibliography at Kate Sharpley Library
 Les Anarchistes, le sionisme et la naissance de l'État d'Israël, by Sylvain Boulouque
 Indymedia in Israel
 East Mediterranean Libertarians

 
Israel
Politics of Israel